Hernando Beach is a census-designated place (CDP) in Hernando County, Florida, United States.  The population was 2,299 at the 2010 census.

In popular media
 Hernando Beach was mentioned in Season 2, Episode 4 of the Starz series "Magic City".

Geography
The community is in southwestern Hernando County, along the Gulf of Mexico. Shoal Line Boulevard forms the eastern edge of the CDP, and the community extends from Osowaw Boulevard in the south to Minnow Creek in the north.

Demographics

As of the census of 2000, there were 2,185 people, 975 households, and 727 families residing in the CDP. The racial makeup of the CDP was 97.71% White, 0.23% African American, 0.41% Native American, 0.55% Asian, 0.18% from other races, and 0.92% from two or more races. Hispanic or Latino of any race were 2.56% of the population.

There were 975 households, out of which 16.3% had children under the age of 18 living with them, 65.9% were married couples living together, 5.5% had a female householder with no husband present, and 25.4% were non-families. 19.5% of all households were made up of individuals, and 9.0% had someone living alone who was 65 years of age or older.  The average household size was 2.24 and the average family size was 2.52.

In the CDP, the population was spread out, with 13.6% under the age of 18, 4.7% from 18 to 24, 16.7% from 25 to 44, 38.8% from 45 to 64, and 26.3% who were 65 years of age or older.  The median age was 53 years. For every 100 females, there were 98.3 males.  For every 100 females age 18 and over, there were 98.3 males.

The median income for a household in the CDP was $47,014, and the median income for a family was $49,605. Males had a median income of $47,093 versus $21,630 for females. The per capita income for the CDP was $25,856.  About 4.2% of families and 6.6% of the population were below the poverty line, including none of those under age 18 and 10.3% of those age 65 or over.

Law enforcement
The Hernando County Sheriff's Office is in charge of law enforcement in Hernando Beach. Their Marine Unit Station headquarters is on Shoal Line Boulevard in Hernando Beach. There is also the Crime Watch in Hernando Beach, supervised by the County Sheriff's office. The United States Coast Guard Auxiliary has their Hernando County Unit, Division 15, Flotilla 8, on Shoal Line as well. Flotilla 8 is in charge of all auxiliary maritime functions for Hernando County, as well as public outreach.

See also
Jenkins Creek Park

References

Census-designated places in Hernando County, Florida
Census-designated places in Florida
Populated coastal places in Florida on the Gulf of Mexico